Zhang Ying may refer to:

Sportspeople
 Zhang Ying (fencer) (born 1982), Chinese fencer
 Zhang Ying (footballer) (born 1985), Chinese footballer
 Zhang Ying (Paralympic swimmer) (born 1990), Chinese Paralympic swimmer
 Zhang Ying (tennis) (born 1996), Chinese tennis player
 Zhang Ying (figure skater) (born 1997), Chinese figure skater
 Zhang Ying (gymnast) (born 1988), Chinese rhythmic gymnast
 Zhang Ying (synchronised swimmer) (born 1963), Chinese synchronised swimmer
 Zhang Ying (field hockey), Chinese field hockey player

Others
Cheung Ying (1919–1984), Hong Kong actor and director
Eileen Chang (1920–1995), Chinese writer, born Chang Ying
Ying Chang Compestine (born 1963), Chinese-American writer
Chong Eng (born 1957), Malaysian politician

See also
Chang Ying (disambiguation)